The 2010 Algarve Formula Two round was the fifth round of the 2010 FIA Formula Two Championship season. It was held on July 2, 2010 and July 3, 2010 at the Autódromo Internacional do Algarve, Portimão, Portugal.

Classification

Qualifying 1

Qualifying 2

Race 1

Race 2

References

FIA Formula Two Championship